The 2006 All-Ireland Senior Club Camogie Championship for the leading clubs in the women's team field sport of camogie was won for the third year in succession by St Lachtain’s, Freshford (Kilkenny), who defeated O’Donovan Rossa (Ant) in the final, played at Portlaoise.

Arrangements
The championship was organised on the traditional provincial system used in Gaelic Games since the 1880s, with Cashel and Athenry winning the championships of the other two provinces. Freshford qualified for the final when sun blinded the Cashel goalkeeper, Jovita Delaney, enabling Imelda Kennedy’s speculative shot to drop under the bar for the only goal of the semi-final.

The Final
Hailstones and high winds made playing conditions difficult in the final. Marie O'Connor’s goal at the start of the second half gave the initiative to Freshford, as Orla McCall goal in reply was Rossa’s last score of the match and St Lachtain’s picked off further points by Imelda Kennedy, Sinéad Connery and Ann Dalton.

Final stages

References

External links
 Camogie Association

2006 in camogie
2006
Cam